Daniel  is a masculine given name and a surname.

Daniel may also refer to:
Daniel (biblical figure)
Book of Daniel, a 2nd-century BCE biblical apocalypse, "an account of the activities and visions of Daniel"
 Daniel (angel), a fallen angel

Literature
Daniel, a 2006 novel by Richard Adams
Daniel (Mankell novel), 2007
Daniel (Old English poem), an adaptation of the Book of Daniel

Music
"Daniel" (Bat for Lashes song) (2009)
"Daniel" (Elton John song) (1973)
 "Daniel", a song by Juliana Hatfield from Beautiful Creature

Places
Daniel, Greater Poland Voivodeship, a village
Daniel, Utah, United States, a town
Daniel, Wyoming, United States, a census-designated place
Daniel (mountain), in the Austrian alps

Other uses
Daniel (comics), a character in the Endless series
Daniel (department store), in the United Kingdom
Daniel (1983 film), by Sidney Lumet
Daniel (2019 film), Danish film
Daniel (rocket), a French experimental rocket
Hurricane Daniel, any of several storms
Daniel (restaurant), New York City, named for chef Daniel Boulud

See also 
Dan (disambiguation)
Dani (disambiguation)
Danial (disambiguation)
Daniele, a given name
Daniele, Greater Poland Voivodeship, a village in west-central Poland
Daniell, surname
Daniels (disambiguation)
Danny (disambiguation)
Danyal, Iran (disambiguation), any of three villages in Iran
H & R Daniel, a producer of English porcelain between 1827 and 1846
Justice Daniel (disambiguation)